Amrita Kak is a Bollywood singer who has made music for many Bollywood films. She is the daughter of Indian politician Beena Kak, and married to Business man Riju Jhunjhunwala  Actor Salman Khan was responsible for introducing her to the film industry, and due to their closeness, she has been called his rakhi sister. She has also sung most of her songs for his films. She has started her own fashion Brand "Amrita the Label".

Career
She was the singer of the songs "Just Chill" from Maine Pyar Kyun Kiya?, "Character Dheela" from Ready, "Desi Beat" from Bodyguard to name a few. She is also trained in Indian classical music.

Personal life
Amrita's mother is Bina Kak, an Indian Politician. She has a brother, Ankur Kak & a rakhi brother, Indian actor Salman Khan, who is her mentor. Amrita is married to Riju Jhunjhunwala on 29 May 2010.

Filmography

References

Indian women playback singers
Living people
Singers from Mumbai
Indian women pop singers
Women musicians from Maharashtra
Bollywood playback singers
21st-century Indian women singers
21st-century Indian singers
1985 births